Elections to Bury Council were held on 22 May 2014, along with the European Parliament elections, 2014. One third of the council was up for election, with each successful candidate to serve a four-year term of office, expiring in 2018. The Labour Party retained control of the Council.

17 seats were contested. The Labour Party won 12 seats, the Conservatives won 4 seats, and the Liberal Democrats won 1 seat.

After the election, the total composition of the council was as follows:
Labour 38
Conservative 11
Liberal Democrats 1
Independent (politician) 1

Election result

Ward results

References

2014 English local elections
2014
2010s in Greater Manchester